Missa de Beata Virgine may refer to:

 The Missa de Beata Virgine (Josquin), by Josquin des Prez
 Missa de Beata Virgine, by Pierre de La Rue
 Missa de Beata Virgine, by Giovanni Pierluigi da Palestrina
 Missa de Beata Virgine, by Cristóbal de Morales
 Missa de Beata Virgine, by Antoine Brumel
 Missa de Beata Virgine, by Tomás Luis de Victoria

Marian hymns